Barnes Bridge Ladies Rowing Club is a rowing club on the River Thames, based at the Civil Service Sports Club Boathouse, Dukes Meadows, Chiswick, West London.

History
The club was originally called the Civil Service Ladies Rowing Association soon merging its boats from different departments as the 'Civil Service Ladies Rowing Club. It was for members of almost all central government departments and agencies.  Mentions appear of it in press as early as 1928.  

By 1975 half of a World Championship eight was picked from the club, to represent Great Britain at Holme Pierrepont National Watersports Centre – their boat becoming a large picture feature of a local newspaper. These were Ann Cork, Jackie Darling, Susan "Sue" Handscomb and Margaret "Maggie" Lambourn. Two of the coxed four and the cox also were chosen from the club. All apart from Handscomb did likewise in Lucerne in 1974.

In 1997 it was renamed the Barnes Bridge Ladies Rowing Club as membership has become open to everyone. The club is affiliated to British Rowing and the combined club/boathouse is shared with Cygnet Rowing Club.

Notable members
Nicola Boyes
Lin Clark
Rosie Clugston
Jackie Darling
Clare Grove
Sue Handscomb
Maggie Lambourn
Liz Monti
Catti Moss
Liz Paton
Pauline Wright

The club produced multiple British champions as the Civil Service Ladies (CSLRC).

Honours

British champions (as CSLRC)

See also
Rowing on the River Thames

References

Sport in London
Rowing clubs in England
Rowing clubs of the River Thames
Tideway Rowing clubs
Sport in the London Borough of Hounslow
Chiswick
Women's sport in London